El Bienamado is a Mexican telenovela produced by Nicandro Díaz González for Televisa. It is an adaptation of the Brazilian telenovela written by Dias Gomes, titled O Bem-Amado produced in 1973. It stars Jesús Ochoa as the titular character.

Plot 
Odorico Cienfuegos (Jesús Ochoa), is a politician who wins the elections for the prefecture of a small municipality called Loreto, under the promise of building a new cemetery. To obtain this position, he counts on the help of three sisters: Justina (Chantal Andere), Dulcina (Nora Salinas), Santina (Irán Castillo), with whom he maintains an amorous adventure, without the sisters knowing between them.

But in spite of this conflict, Odorico's greatest problem is his daughter Valeria (Mariluz Bermúdez), who returns to the town and falls madly in love with Leon Serrano (Mark Tacher), the new doctor of the region. Valeria and Leon met in Mexico City after Valeria had an overdose from alcohol. Leon quickly becomes Odorico's enemy. Odorico, obsessed with the famous cemetery, quickly needs someone to die. However, no case of death has been recorded in recent times, causing Odorico to use every chance he has to tell a depressed citizen, such as Liborio, who is abandoned by his wife several times, that they will have a great funeral.

Cast

Main 
 Jesús Ochoa as Odorico Samperio
 Mariluz Bermúdez as Valeria Samperio
 Mark Tacher as León Serrano
 Andrés Palacios as Homero Samperio 

 Nora Salinas as Dulcina Samperio
 Chantal Andere as Justina Samperio
 Irán Castillo as Santina Samperio
 Salvador Zerboni as Jairo Portela
 Alejandra Sandoval as Melissa
 Alejandra García as Tania Mendoza
 Diego de Erice as Dirceo Retana
 Fernando Ciangherotti as Genovevo Morones
 Gabriela Zamora as Paquita Patiño
 Luis Manuel Ávila as Pepón Cano
 Luis Gatica as Ambrosio Cárdenas
 Polo Morín as Jordi de Ovando
 Raquel Pankowsky as Concordia Briceño
 Roberto Romano as Alexis Cienfuegos
 Ricardo Fastlicht as Trevor
 Dayrén Chávez as Jovita
 Raquel Morell as Generosa
 Michelle Rodríguez as Estrella
 César Bono as Padre Dimas
 Reynaldo Rossano as Fidel
 Ricardo Margaleff as Juancho López
 Ricardo Silva as Liborio Galicia Ortíz
 Chao as Binicio Luna
 Memo Dorantes as Camilo
 Fernando Larragaña
 Pepe Olivares as Sortero Bermejo
 Mauricio Castillo as Quirino
 Tony Balardi as Jilguero
 José Montini as Policía Pomponio
 Diana Golden as Abigaíl de Morones
 Eduardo Rodríguez as Carrasco
 Eduardo Manzano as Don Arcadio Mendoza
 Laura Zapata as Bruna Mendoza

Recurring 
 Martín Brek as Arnulfo
 Rosita Bouchot as Talita Prieto
 Jaime Garza as Apolo

Special participation 
 Jacqueline Bracamontes as Laura
 Olivia Collins as Olguita Montes

Production 
The telenovela is written by Kary Fajer and Ximena Suárez, based on the original idea of Dias Gomes. Production of the series began on November 8, 2016 in Loreto, Baja California Sur.

Casting 
Before production, actors like Jorge Salinas and Fernando Ciangherotti were rumored to be the main character of the story. It was later revealed that Jesús Ochoa was confirmed as the protagonist, and Ciangherotti was chosen as supporting actor.

Episodes

Awards and nominations

References

External links 
 

Mexican telenovelas
Televisa telenovelas
2017 telenovelas
2017 Mexican television series debuts
2017 Mexican television series endings
Mexican television series based on Brazilian television series
Spanish-language telenovelas